Marina di Bibbona is a coastal town, a frazione of the municipality of Bibbona, in Tuscany, Italy.

Marina di Bibbona is situated on the Tuscan Riviera, also known as the Costa degli Etruschi, on the coast of the Tyrrhenian Sea.

The town has developed next to the Fort of Bibbona, a defensive tower built by the Grand Duchy of Tuscany in the second part of the 18th century.

From the 1980s there has been a high construction growth, especially for summer houses and residences for tourists. This has contributed to make the town a prominent holiday resort.

Cities and towns in Tuscany
Frazioni of the Province of Livorno